Walter Schnee (8 August 1885 in Rawitsch, now Rawicz – 10 June 1958 in Leipzig) was a German mathematician. From 1904 to 1908 he studied mathematics in Berlin. From 1909 to 1917 he worked at the University of Breslau. He then went to the University of Leipzig, where he stayed till 1954. He worked in the field of number theory.

References
 
 Walter Schnee

1885 births
1958 deaths
People from Rawicz
People from the Province of Posen
20th-century German mathematicians